Correct or Correctness may refer to:

 What is true
 Accurate; Error-free 
 Correctness (computer science), in theoretical computer science
 Political correctness, a sociolinguistic concept
 Correct, Indiana, an unincorporated community in the United States

See also
 Correct Craft, a U.S.-based builder of powerboats
 Correct sampling, a sampling scenario in Gy's sampling theory
 Right (disambiguation)